Montgolfier is a worn lunar impact crater that is located in the northern hemisphere of the Moon's far side. To the east-northeast is the crater Paraskevopoulos, and southwest of Montgolfier lies Schneller.  Due south is the smaller Woltjer.

The entire southern rim of this crater has been overlain by a cluster of four smaller craters. The remaining rim has been worn by smaller impacts, leaving a somewhat uneven perimeter that is overlain by some small craterlets. The interior floor is pitted by several small and tiny craterlets, and lacks a central peak.

Satellite craters
By convention these features are identified on lunar maps by placing the letter on the side of the crater midpoint that is closest to Montgolfier.

References

 
 
 
 
 
 
 
 
 
 
 
 

Impact craters on the Moon
Crater